Gazeta Shqiptare is the oldest independent Albanian-language newspaper published in Albania.

History 
Founded in 1927, the paper's publication would cease 12 years later, following the fascist Italian invasion of 1939. The paper resumed publishing on 22 April 1993.

Gazeta Shqiptare had a circulation of 9,677 copies in the early 2000s.

See also
 List of newspapers in Albania
 News in Albania

References

1993 establishments in Albania
Publications established in 1993
Newspapers published in Albania
Albanian-language newspapers